Arthrolycosa (meaning wolf [spider] with joints) is an extinct genus of arachnids, possibly spiders, that lived about 300-250 million years ago.

Fossils have been found Mazon Creek USA and in the Kirov Oblast region of Russia.

A. antiqua is estimated to have a body length of about 2.17 cm and may have preyed upon insects and other smaller animals that lived alongside them.

External links & References

 Parker, Steve. Dinosaurus: the complete guide to dinosaurs. Firefly Books Inc, 2003. Pg. 75
 
 

Prehistoric arachnid genera
Paleozoic arachnids
Fossils of the United States
Fossils of Russia
Pennsylvanian first appearances
Lopingian genus extinctions
Animals described in 1874
Fossil taxa described in 1874